Mesut is a Turkish given name for males, derived from the Arabic name Masoud. People named Mesut include:

 Mesut of Menteşe (died 1319), Turkish bey
 Mesut Bakkal (born 1964), Turkish football manager
 Mesut Cemil (1902–1963), Turkish composer and musician
 Mesut Doğan (born 1982), Turkish Austrian futsal player
 Mesut İktu (born 1947), Turkish voice musician
 Mesut Mert (born 1978), Canadian footballer
 Mesut Özgür (born 1990), Turkish footballer
 Mesut Özil (born 1988), German footballer
 Mesut Yılmaz (1947–2020), former Prime Minister of Turkey

Turkish masculine given names